The saddleback toads (Brachycephalus) are a genus of tiny toads and frogs in the family Brachycephalidae in the order Anura, ranging from south Bahia to Santa Catarina in southeastern Brazil. The genus includes two main groups, the often brightly coloured pumpkin toadlets, and the overall brown and more frog-like flea frogs (or flea toads), which once were placed in their own genus Psyllophryne. Some pumpkin toadlets are toxic and their often bright colours are considered aposematic.

They are mostly diurnal, feed on tiny invertebrates and breeding is by direct development, with eggs laid on land and hatching into young frogs (no tadpole stage).

The majority of the Brachycephalus species have only been discovered in the 21st century. Most species have tiny ranges and are seriously threatened.

Appearance

Morphology and size

The common name "saddleback toad" refers to the bony shields that cover their vertebrae, but these are not present in all species in the genus and their function is unclear in the species that do have them. The genus can be divided into two main subgroups: The pumpkin toadlets comprises most species in the genus. They have an overall toad-like appearance and morphology, and they mostly walk (they are unable to jump far). The second group are the flea frogs or flea toads (B. didactylus, B. hermogenesi, B. pulex and B. sulfuratus) that have an appearance and morphology that is more like leptodactylid frogs, and they are better jumpers. The name "flea frog" is also sometimes used for the unrelated Adelophryne. The skin of the saddleback toads can be rugose (bumpy) or smooth. Their toes/fingers are reduced compared to most other frogs, with typically only two to four being clearly visible on each foot/hand. Some of the bones in their skull are also reduced.

Females tend to be larger than males of the same species. At , B. pulex has the smallest maximum adult size reported in the genus, while B. sulfuratus at  has the smallest minimum adult size in the genus, but its maximum size surpasses that reported for a few others. This makes them the smallest frogs in the Americas, with only the northeast Brazilian Adelophryne michelin, and Cuban Eleutherodactylus iberia and E. limbatus approaching their tiny dimensions. In other continents, the only similar-sized or slightly smaller frogs are a few species in the genera Mini, Paedophryne and Stumpffia. Newly hatched saddleback toads are much smaller than the already tiny adults. For example, they are typically  in B. ephippium, a species where adults are at least .

Colour and toxicity
The different Brachycephalus vary greatly in colour and this is often useful for separating the species from each other. Within each species, there are often also some individual variations, especially in the details of their pattern.

The flea frogs or flea toads (B. didactylus, B. hermogenesi, B. pulex and B. sulfuratus) are well-camouflaged and overall brown, often with sections that are greyer or near-black, and sometimes with a few poorly-defined yellowish spots below.

Among the remaining species in the genus, almost all have both underparts and upperparts that are at least partially yellow or orange. They are collectively known as pumpkin toadlets, which is a reference to the colour. In some species, this colour is almost uniform throughout, earning them the name Brazilian gold frog (sometimes misapplied to the all-brown flea frog B. didactylus). However, in many species the yellow or orange is partial and incomplete. On the underparts, the yellow or orange may form a spotted or mottled pattern on a dull and dark background. On the upperparts, there can be spots, mottling or patches in black, brown, greenish, whitish or reddish. This results in some species where most but not all of the upperparts are yellow or orange and others where only small sections are yellow or orange. Two particularly dull-coloured species, B. brunneus and B. curupira, are overall brown, while a few others are essentially all-brown or greenish above (sometimes with whitish on the mid-back), limiting yellow or orange to the underparts. In species where known, including ones that are bright orange-yellow as adults, the newly hatched juveniles are mostly brown overall and may have white markings below.

The bright yellow, orange or reddish colours of many species in this genus are generally considered aposematic (warning colours), but toxicity has only been studied in a few species. The brightly coloured B. ephippium and B. pernix have tetrodotoxin and similar toxins in their skin and organs, whereas B. nodoterga, which has a much more subdued colouring but still with some yellow-orange, appears to be non-toxic. It is unknown how certain Brachycephalus species attain the strong neurotoxins, but they are possibly absorbed from the small invertebrates they eat, as known from some poison dart frogs and mantella frogs, or produced by bacteria inside their body.

At least two brightly coloured species, B. ephippium and B. pitanga, have bones that are fluorescent, which is visible through the skin of the toadlet when exposed to UV light. It was initially speculated that the fluorescent colour also is aposematic or that it is related to mate choice (species recognition or determining fitness of a potential partner), but later studies indicate that the former explanation is unlikely, as predation attempts on the toadlets appear to be unaffected by the presence/absence of fluorescence.

Voice and hearing

Although not very loud for a frog/toad (even relative to their tiny size), Brachycephalus are most often located by their call. The primary calls are by adult males, but females and young may also call. A single square meter (slightly more than 10 sq ft) can host as many as five calling males, and at a single location one may hear tens of males at once. Males will defend their small territory from other males, but in most cases voice or visual displays are sufficient and fights are avoided.

The advertising calls by males are performed either from a hidden or an exposed position. Whether a species is dull or brightly coloured does not accurately predict if it prefers an exposed or hidden calling position. In addition to advertising calls, there are aggressive calls directed towards other males when close. The calls of the different species differ to various extent in frequency, speed, structure and other features.

Peculiarly, at least the brightly coloured pumpkin toadlets B. ephippium and B. pitanga are unable to hear the frequency of their own advertising calls, as their ears are underdeveloped. Instead their communication appears to rely on certain movements like the vocal sac that inflates when calling, mouth gaping and waving of their arms. It is speculated that their calling is a vestigiality from the ancestral form of the genus, whereas their reduced hearing ability (they do have some hearing ability in frequencies outside their call) is a novel change in these species. Sounds make them more vulnerable to predators, but there has likely been little direct evolutionary pressure to lose it because of their toxicity. Unlike B. ephippium, B. pitanga and some others, many species in the genus always call from a hidden position, making any signalling by movements inefficient, and it is likely they can hear their own calls. Direct studies of the medium-brightly coloured (mostly dull above, bright below) pumpkin toadlet B. actaeus and the dull-coloured flea frog  B. hermogenesi strongly suggest that they are able to hear their own calls.

Behavior

During dry conditions, both sexes tend to stay hidden in the leaf litter and there is little noticeable activity, but during the wet season and high humidity the males and in some species also females may move to the top of the leaf litter. In some species, they often take up quite conspicuous positions during this time.

Overall the saddleback toads are mostly active during the day, but some activity also occurs during the night and some species possibly are mostly nocturnal.

Breeding
In general, saddleback toads are reported to use axillary or nearly axillary amplexus where a male uses his front limbs to grab a female at her front limbs. However, whereas most frogs typically only use one technique, at least B. ephippium will use two, beginning with an inguinal amplexus (where the male holds the female around the lower waist, just in front of her hindlimbs) and only later changing to a nearly axillary position.

Based on the few species where the breeding behavior is known, the female saddleback toad lays about five or less yellow or yellow-white eggs, which are relatively large compared to the size of the adult. They are deposited in a hidden location (for example, under leaf litter or a tree log) on land. The female rolls them until they are covered in particles, making them almost indistinguishable from the soil where they have been laid, but it may also help to preserve their water content. After about two months, they hatch into juvenile toads/frogs. There is no tadpole or other aquatic stage.

Feeding
Relatively little is known about the feeding behavior of saddleback toads, but they will take a wide range of minute invertebrates. They are known to feed on insects (among others, ants, true bugs, beetles, grasshoppers and flies) and their larvae, springtails, mites, spiders, pseudoscorpions, millipedes, snails and isopods.

Jumping

Unlike most amphibians, Brachycephalus are hindered in their ability to land reliably after jumping. Due to Brachycephalus' extremely small head and body size, vestibular systems in the genus are too small for dependable locomotion, and in turn the endolymph — which is regarded by Poiseuille's law — is not detected by sensory hairs and makes it difficult for individuals of Brachycephalus to sense changes in angular acceleration during a jump. For the same reason they are moving slowly when they walk. Because of the uncontrolled jumping and slow walking, they have evolved defense mechanisms such as toxicity and bony plates (osteoderms) as protection against predators.

Conservation status

Only 11 species of saddleback toads have been officially rated by the IUCN, all between 2004 and 2010, with 3 species listed as least concern (not threatened) and the remaining data deficient (insufficient data for rating them). Since then, many new species have been recognised and more data has become available for evaluating their conservation status. In a review in 2019 that included all species recognised up until then and used IUCN's definitions, 10 species were data deficient, 5 least concern, 10 vulnerable, 5 endangered and 6 critically endangered. Two of the data deficient species, B. atelopoide and B. bufonoides, have not been recorded since their original scientific descriptions a century ago and they are unknown in life.

The three flea frogs B. didactylus, B. hermogenesi and B. sulfuratus and the pumpkin toadlet B. ephippiumsi are relatively widespread in both distribution and altitude range (lowlands to about ), although it is possible that the last of these actually is a species complex. These are typically in cloud forest on sky island mountaintops and most species have completely separate distribution, isolated from each other by valleys and unsuitable habitat. Where found, they can however be common, sometimes even abundant. Although some of the range-restricted species have well-protected distributions in reserves, many of the species do not. Their small distributions make them highly vulnerable to habitat loss and degradation from climate change (changing temperature and rain patterns), fire, grazing by livestock, and deforestation for tree extraction and to make room for plantations, farming and cattle ranching. Some Brachycephalus species have also been found to be afflicted by recurrent outbreaks of Batrachochytrium dendrobatidis despite the fungus largely affecting aquatic frogs; these outbreaks have been linked to dry years where low water availability poses a physiological stress on frogs and also forces them to retreat to refugia where they are at a high population density.

Classification and discovery

Family
Brachycephalus lacks a Bidder's organ, but were historically included in the true toad family Bufonidae, where one of the defining features is its presence. Brachycephalus was subsequently placed in Atelopodidae or Brachycephalidae, with the latter being the generally accepted treatment in recent decades. Initially some authorities placed numerous genera in Brachycephalidae, while others limited it to only contain the genus Brachycephalus. Genetic studies have shown that most of these genera belong in other families, but the—in morphology quite different—genus Ischnocnema is a close relative of Brachycephalus and they belong together as the only members of Brachycephalidae.

Genus and species groups

Within Brachycephalus, there are two rather distinctive groups: the typical members are the pumpkin toadlets, while the remaining four species are the flea frogs or flea toads (B. didactylus, B. hermogenesi, B. pulex and B. sulfuratus). Until 2002, the latter group, which is relatively widespread, was regarded as a separate genus, Psyllophryne, but it is now considered a synonym of Brachycephalus. The pumpkin toadlets, which largely are restricted to highlands and foothills, can be further divided into two subgroups: the southern B. pernix subgroup (Paraná and Santa Catarina) and the northern B. ephippium subgroup (São Paulo and north). Among the pumpkin toadlets, colours alone are not a good indicator of phylogenetic relationships. For example, the brown B. curupira is closely related to the golden B. izecksohni and the brown B. brunneus is closely related to the golden B. leopardus, but these species pairs are more distant from each other.

Species

The first species, Brachycephalus ephippium, was already described by Johann Baptist von Spix in 1824, but originally in the genus Bufo. Two years later the genus Brachycephalus was coined by Leopold Fitzinger. In 1920, four additional "variants" were described by Alípio de Miranda-Ribeiro, but in 1955 a review did not recognise them, arguing that they were synonyms of B. ephippium. Another species, B. didactylus, was described in 1971 by Eugênio Izecksohn, but placed in its own genus Psyllophryne. As a consequence, B. ephippium was the only widely recognised species in the genus; it was the pumpkin toadlet. In 1990, B. nodoterga (one of the variants that had been described in 1920) was instated as a valid species, bringing the number of generally recognised Brachycephalus species to two.

Starting in 1998, this changed dramatically. Since that year, there has been a couple of years at most between the description of new species and some years where several were described, peaking at eight species in 2015 alone. Additionally, the three remaining variants that had been described in 1920 were instated as valid species in 2010 and the former Psyllophryne species were moved into Brachycephalus in 2002. , there were 36 recognised species of Brachycephalus. The many recently discovered species have mostly been the result of scientists visiting isolated highland peaks, so-called sky islands that are separated from each other by valleys. Although now generally recognised, the distinction of some of these recently described species has been questioned by some authorities since they often have been separated mainly by colour and skin texture, features that can be variable in frogs/toads.

List

According to Amphibian Species of the World, the following species are recognised in the genus Brachycephalus:

 Brachycephalus actaeus Monteiro et al., 2018
 Brachycephalus albolineatus Bornschein et al., 2016
 Brachycephalus alipioi Pombal & Gasparini, 2006
 Brachycephalus atelopoide Miranda-Ribeiro, 1920 
 Brachycephalus auroguttatus Ribeiro et al., 2015
 Brachycephalus boticario Ribeiro et al., 2015
 Brachycephalus brunneus Ribeiro et al., 2005
 Brachycephalus bufonoides Miranda-Ribeiro, 1920 
 Brachycephalus coloratus Ribeiro et al., 2017
 Brachycephalus crispus Condez, Clemente-Carvalho, Haddad & Reis, 2014 
 Brachycephalus curupira Ribeiro et al., 2017
 Brachycephalus darkside Guimarães, Luz, Rocha & Feio, 2017
 Brachycephalus didactylus (Izecksohn, 1971)
 Spix’s saddleback toad (Brachycephalus ephippium) (Spix, 1824)
 Brachycephalus ferruginus Alves et al., 2006
 Brachycephalus fuscolineatus Ribeiro et al., 2015
 Brachycephalus garbeanus Miranda-Ribeiro, 1920 
 Brachycephalus guarani Clemente-Carvalho et al., 2012
 Brachycephalus hermogenesi (Giaretta & Sawaya, 1998)
Brachycephalus ibitinga Condez et al., 2021
 Brachycephalus izecksohni Ribeiro et al., 2005
 Brachycephalus leopardus Ribeiro et al., 2015
 Brachycephalus margaritatus Pombal & Izecksohn, 2011
 Brachycephalus mariaeterezae Ribeiro et al., 2015
 Brachycephalus mirissimus Pie et al., 2018
 Serra Cantareira saddleback toad (Brachycephalus nodoterga) Miranda-Ribeiro, 1920
Brachycephalus olivaceus Ribeiro et al., 2015
Brachycephalus pernix Pombal, Wistuba & Bornschein, 1998
 Red pumpkin toadlet (Brachycephalus pitanga) Alves, Sawaya, Reis & Haddad, 2009
Brachycephalus pombali Alves et al., 2006
Brachycephalus pulex Napoli, Caramschi, Cruz & Dias, 2011
Brachycephalus quiririensis Pie & Ribeiro, 2015
Brachycephalus rotenbergae Nunes et al., 2021
Brachycephalus sulfuratus Condez et al., 2016
Brachycephalus toby Haddad et al., 2010
Brachycephalus tridactylus Garey et al., 2012
Brachycephalus verrucosus Ribeiro et al., 2015
Brachycephalus vertebralis Pombal, 2001

References

Taxa named by Leopold Fitzinger